Nilssonia may refer to: 

Nilssonia (turtle), a softshell turtle genus
Nilssonia (plant), a form genus of Mesozoic leaf fossils